Archai may refer to:
the plural of Arche, the beginning or the first principle of the world in the ancient Greek philosophy
Archai (journal), a philosophy journal
Archaï, an album by the Belgian folk band Kadril

See also
Arche (disambiguation)